Kelvin Vincent Smith (born March 20, 1984) is a former American football linebacker in the National Football League for the Miami Dolphins, Carolina Panthers and Dallas Cowboys. He was drafted by the Miami Dolphins in the seventh round of the 2007 NFL Draft. He played college football at Syracuse.

Early years
Smith attended North Rockland High School in Thiells, New York where he played defensive end, middle linebacker and fullback.

As a senior, he posted 150 tackles, 6 interceptions, 3 fumble recoveries, 700 rushing yards and 7 touchdowns. He received New York Sportwriters’ Association First-team Class AA All-State Defense, New York Sportwriters’ Association Section 1 Player of the Year and PrepStar All-American honors.

College career
Smith accepted a football scholarship from Syracuse University. As a freshman, he started 11 out of 12 games after, after linebacker Jameel Dumas suffered a knee injury in the season opener. He made 68 tackles (6 for loss), one sack and one interception.

As a sophomore, he started all 12 games, registering 53 tackles (4 for loss), 2 two interceptions, including one returned for a touchdown. As a junior, he started all 11 games, recording 84 tackles (led the team), 2 sacks, 7 tackles for loss and one interception.

As senior, he started all 12 games, collecting 115 tackles (second in the Big East Conference), 2.5 sacks, 4.5 tackles for loss, one interception, 2 forced fumbles and 2 fumble recoveries.

He finished his college career after starting 46 straight games, including 2 seasons at outside linebacker and 2 at middle linebacker. He made 320 tackles, 21.5 tackles for loss (11th in school history), 4.5 sacks and 5 interceptions.

Professional career
Smith was selected by the Miami Dolphins in the 7th round (219th overall) of the 2007 NFL Draft. He was waived on September 7 and later signed to the practice squad. He was promoted to the active roster on December 4. In 2008, he suffered a serious knee injury in the first preseason game against the Tampa Bay Buccaneers. He was waived injured on August 11. In January 2009, he was re-signed. He was released on February 10.

On May 10, 2009, he was signed by the New York Giants. He was released on July 30.

On August 9, 2009, he was signed by the Carolina Panthers. On November 10, he was promoted to the active roster after linebacker Thomas Davis was lost for the season with a knee injury. He was waived injured on December 1.

On August 11, 2010, he was signed by the Chicago Bears. He was released on September 3.

In 2010, he was signed to the Dallas Cowboys practice squad. On January 3, 2011, he was re-signed. He was released on July 28.

On July 31, 2011, he was claimed off waivers by the Carolina Panthers. He was waived injured on August 7.

Personal life
Smith is the nephew of former NFL linebacker and fellow Syracuse alum Keith Bulluck.

References

External links
Syracuse Orange bio

1984 births
Living people
People from Spring Valley, New York
Players of American football from New York (state)
American football linebackers
Syracuse Orange football players
Miami Dolphins players
New York Giants players
Carolina Panthers players
Chicago Bears players
Dallas Cowboys players
People from Thiells, New York